Jamalpur is a Union Council of Hasilpur Tehsil, Bahawalpur District, Punjab, Pakistan. The Sutlej River flows through it. Main crops grown here are cotton, wheat, sugarcane and also animal rearing.

References

Populated places in Bahawalpur District